The Men's individual sprint at the 2006 Commonwealth Games took place on March 18, 2006 at the Vodafone Arena.

Qualification
Seeding is decided by a 200 metre time trial.

Results

1/8 Finals

1/8 Finals Repechage

Quarter-finals

Race for 5th-8th Places

Semi-finals

Finals

External links
 Qualification
 1/8 Finals
 1/8 Finals Repechage
 Quarter-finals
 Race for 5th-8th Places
 Semi-finals
 Finals

Track cycling at the 2006 Commonwealth Games
Cycling at the Commonwealth Games – Men's sprint